Raymond Zahab,  (born in 1969) is a Canadian long-distance runner and public speaker. He has run in long-distance running adventures in several countries, including the South Pole, Siberia, and the Atacama Desert in Chile. He crossed the Sahara with Charlie Engle, (USA) and Kevin Lin (Taiwan).

Zahab starred in the 2007 documentary film "Running the Sahara" narrated and produced by Matt Damon and directed by Oscar-winner James Moll, which follows three men as they run across the Sahara Desert, a journey of 111 days and more than 4,300 miles of challenging terrain.

Zahab is also the author of the autobiography Running for My Life: On the Extreme Road with Adventure Runner Ray Zahab, and co-author with Steve Pitt of Running to Extremes: Ray Zahab's Amazing Ultra marathon Journey

(). and co author with Eric Walters of Just Deserts.

Results
 Gobi March Team 2006 — 1st
 Sahara Race 2005 — 1st
 Libyan Challenge 2006 — 1st
 BadWater Ultra — DNF
 Marathon des Sables 2005 — 24th
 Trans333 2004 — 3rd
 Jungle Marathon Solo 2004 — 8th
 Jungle Marathon Team 2004 — 1st
 Marathon des Sables 2004 — 47th
 Yukon Arctic Ultra 2004 — 1st

Honours 
In 2015, he was awarded the Meritorious Service Cross.

References

External links
 
 impossible2possible website
 Running the Sahara website
 
 

1960s births
Living people
Canadian ultramarathon runners
Canadian track and field coaches
Canadian male long-distance runners
Canadian motivational speakers
Male ultramarathon runners
Recipients of the Meritorious Service Decoration